The O'Connell River is a river in North Queensland, Australia.

The headwaters of the river rise in a valley under Mount Millar in the Clarke Range, part of the Great Dividing Range, just north of the Eungella National Park. It flows in a northerly direction parallel with the Bruce Highway passing Kamo and Caping then discharging into the Repulse Fish Habitat area near Covering Beach and onto the Coral Sea.

See also

References

Rivers of Queensland
North Queensland